Rodante Dizon Marcoleta (born July 29, 1953) is a Filipino politician serving as the party-list representative for SAGIP since 2016. He is a former House Deputy Speaker of the 18th Congress from 2019 to 2022. A successful member of the religious organization Iglesia ni Cristo, Marcoleta is one of the vocal opponents against ABS-CBN and one of the 70 representatives who voted to permanently deny the franchise renewal of the network as well as responsible for the termination of ABS-CBN and TV5's landmark partnership deal. Marcoleta is also the host of Net 25 public affairs program, Sa Ganang Mamamayan (lit. For Citizens).

Political career

Party-list representative 
Marcoleta was elected to the House of Representatives of the Philippines under the 13th Congress representing the party-list of Alagad from 2004 to 2007 and again under the 15th Congress from 2009 until 2013. In 2016, under the 17th Congress, he was elected party-list representative of the Social Amelioration & Genuine Intervention on Poverty Partylist, more commonly known by its abbreviation SAGIP. He is known as the proponent of slashing the budget of the Commission on Human Rights to 1,000 pesos. Marcoleta was one of the principal authors of the landmark law Magna Carta of the Poor, which was signed by President Rodrigo Duterte in April 2019.

Ivermectin pantry

In April 2021, Marcoleta and Anakalusugan party-list representative Mike Defensor initiated an "ivermectin pan-three" that distributes the anti-parasitic drug ivermectin, despite warnings from the World Health Organization on the lack of evidence to support the drug's efficacy against COVID-19.

Senate candidacy
In September 2021, Marcoleta was nominated by the PDP–Laban political party to run for senator in the 2022 Philippine Senate elections. On April 27, 2022, twelve days prior to the elections, Marcoleta withdrew his senatorial bid citing his 'poor showing' in the surveys.

References

1953 births
Deputy Speakers of the House of Representatives of the Philippines
Living people
Members of Iglesia ni Cristo
Party-list members of the House of Representatives of the Philippines
People from Tarlac
Tagalog people